Samuel Sáiz Alonso (born 22 January 1991) is a Spanish professional footballer who plays as an attacking midfielder or a forward for Turkish club Sivasspor.

He spent most of his career in the Spanish lower leagues, amassing Segunda División totals of 165 games and 23 goals with Huesca and Girona after signing with the former club at the age of 24. In La Liga, he appeared in 11 matches for Getafe over two separate spells and eight for Girona, and also spent one and a half years in the English Championship with Leeds United.

Club career

Real Madrid
Born in Madrid, Sáiz arrived in Real Madrid's youth system at the age of eight. He made his senior debut late into 2008–09 – one game – as the B team competed in the Segunda División B. In the following season, spent in the same level, he contributed more solidly, but they could only rank in eighth position, thus failing to reach the promotion playoff stage.

For the 2010–11 campaign, Sáiz was loaned to Sevilla FC's reserves also in division three, in a season-long move. In the following transfer window, however, he returned to Real Madrid, being assigned to its C side in the Tercera División.

Melilla and Getafe
On 17 August 2011, Sáiz returned to the third tier and joined UD Melilla, with Real retaining a buyback option on the player. Late into the following transfer window, however, he terminated his contract and signed with Getafe CF's reserves in the same league. He made his first-team – and La Liga – debut on 1 April 2012, coming on as a substitute for Jaime Gavilán for the last 12 minutes of a 3–0 away loss against Atlético Madrid.

Almería and Atlético
Sáiz signed with UD Almería B on 8 July 2013. In January of the following year he moved teams again, joining Atlético Madrid B also in the third division.

Occasionally called for training with Atlético's main squad under manager Diego Simeone, Sáiz was also an unused substitute in a league match against Villarreal CF.

Huesca
On 5 August 2015, Sáiz joined SD Huesca from Segunda División in a season-long move. He scored his first professional goal 17 days later, but in a 3–2 home defeat to Deportivo Alavés. He netted a further two times in his first year, from 30 overall appearances.

Sáiz signed a permanent contract with the Aragonese club in late March 2016, until June 2018. In the following campaign he scored a career-best 12 goals, as his team was ousted in the promotion play-offs.

Leeds United
On 10 July 2017, Huesca and Leeds United reached an agreement for the transfer of Sáiz. Three days later, the latter club announced the signing of a four-year contract after a successful medical. He made his competitive debut on 9 August, scoring a hat-trick in a 4–1 victory over Port Vale in the EFL Cup; in doing so, he became their first player to achieve the feat in his first game since Carl Shutt in 1989. His first Championship appearance took place three days later, in a 0–0 home draw against Preston North End.

Sáiz opened his league scoring account on 19 August 2017, contributing to the 2–0 win at Sunderland. The following 7 January, he was involved in an off-the-ball incident and was shown a red card for allegedly spitting at an opposition player during the 2–1 defeat to Newport County in the FA Cup. He returned from his six-match suspension on 21 February in a 2–2 draw against Derby County, providing an assist for Ezgjan Alioski.

After ending the season with nine goals and seven assists, Sáiz was nominated as one of four players for Leeds' Player of The Year award on 16 April 2018. For the following campaign, he was given the number 14 shirt.

On 17 December 2018, Sáiz was loaned to his former club Getafe for six months. He made his debut on 6 January 2019, playing 16 minutes in a 2–1 home loss against FC Barcelona. He scored his first goal in the Spanish top flight on 28 April, but in a defeat at Real Sociedad by the same scoreline.

Girona
Sáiz joined Girona FC on 18 July 2019, for an undisclosed fee. He contributed three goals from 40 games in the 2021–22 season, in a return to the top tier after three years; on 1 April 2022, however, as he was being replaced in the first half of the league fixture against Málaga CF (eventual 1–0 home win), he called manager Míchel a "clown" and threw away his shirt.

On 27 January 2023, Sáiz left the Estadi Montilivi after 120 official matches and 12 goals.

Sivasspor
Sáiz signed a year-and-a-half contract with Sivasspor of the Turkish Süper Lig immediately after leaving Girona.

International career
Sáiz represented Spain at under-19 level.

Career statistics

Club

References

External links

1991 births
Living people
Spanish footballers
Footballers from Madrid
Association football midfielders
Association football forwards
La Liga players
Segunda División players
Segunda División B players
Tercera División players
Real Madrid C footballers
Real Madrid Castilla footballers
Sevilla Atlético players
UD Melilla footballers
Getafe CF B players
Getafe CF footballers
UD Almería B players
Atlético Madrid B players
SD Huesca footballers
Girona FC players
English Football League players
Leeds United F.C. players
Süper Lig players
Sivasspor footballers
Spain youth international footballers
Spanish expatriate footballers
Expatriate footballers in England
Expatriate footballers in Turkey
Spanish expatriate sportspeople in England
Spanish expatriate sportspeople in Turkey